Hrachya Sargsyan (born February 13, 1985) is an Armenian politician. He became Mayor of Yerevan on 22 December 2021. He is a member of My Step Alliance party. He was elected Deputy Mayor per snap elections of Yerevan City Council on 23 September 2018 for My Step Alliance, and was appointed as deputy mayor in October 2018. Sargsyan became Mayor on 22 December 2021 when incumbent mayor Hayk Marutyan lost a no confidence vote.

References

Living people 
1985 births
Mayors of Yerevan
21st-century Armenian politicians